The western kingbird (Tyrannus verticalis) is a large tyrant flycatcher found throughout western environments of North America, as far south as Mexico.

Description
Adults are a combination of both gray and yellow plumage, along with crimson feathers that are hidden until courtship or against intruders. Characteristic of kingbird species, the western kingbird is very territorial. Although the western is often misidentified as Cassin's kingbird, Couch's kingbird, or the tropical kingbird due to the yellow coloration, it can be distinguished from these other species through its black, squared tail with white edges.

Anatomy and morphology

Distribution and habitat 

The breeding habitat is open areas in western North America. The increased presence of trees throughout the Great Plains during the past century due to fire suppression and tree planting facilitated the range expansion of the western kingbird, as well as range expansions of many other species of birds.

Behavior 
The name kingbird is derived from their "take-charge" behavior. These birds aggressively defend their territory, even against much larger birds such as hawks. They will attack humans, livestock, and pets when they think their young are in danger. Kingbirds make a sturdy cup nest in a tree or shrub, sometimes on top of a pole or other man-made structure. Three to five white, creamy, or pinkish eggs with heavy blotches of brown, black, or lavender are laid and incubated for 12 to 14 days. Due to the small size of the nest, and the chicks' rapid rate of growth, most of them are pushed out of the nest, due to overcrowding, before they are fully feathered and able to fly.  

They wait on an open perch and fly out to catch insects such as bees, robber flies, winged ants, grasshoppers, and spiders. They are also known to eat berries, buckthorn/sumac, and poison ivy seeds.

These birds migrate in flocks to Florida and the Pacific coast of southern Mexico and Central America.

Sound 
The song is a squeaky chatter, sometimes compared to a squeaky toy. The call is a sharp loud whit. It occasionally sings before sunrise.

References

External links

 Western kingbird Species account - Cornell Lab of Ornithology
 Western kingbird - Tyrannus verticalis - USGS Patuxent Bird Identification InfoCenter
 Western kingbird attacking red tailed hawk with photo - Denver Post, 30 September 2009
 
 
 
 
 
 
 Western kingbird Life History - All About Birds

western kingbird
Native birds of Western Canada
Native birds of the Canadian Prairies
Native birds of the Western United States
Native birds of the Plains-Midwest (United States)
western kingbird
western kingbird